Burn the Flags the first full album by the extreme metal band By Night.

Tracks

Between The Lines - 4:30
Part of Perfection - 3:07
One and the Same - 3:45
Raise Your Voice - 3:59
Completed - 5:35
Behind in Silence - 4:28
Unseen Oppression - 3:23
At the End of the Day - 3:26
Dead or Confused - 3:29

Musicians
Adrian Westin - vocals
André Gonzales - Lead and rhythm guitar
Simon Wien - Rhythm and lead guitar
Henrik Persson - Bass
Per Qvarnström - drums

By Night albums
2005 albums